John Strzemp, II (born 1952) is a casino executive and poker player based in Las Vegas, Nevada, United States. He was the Executive Vice President and Chief Administrative Officer of Wynn Resorts. He was previously an executive with other casinos in Las Vegas, including the Mirage Casino.

As a tournament poker player, Strzemp's best showing was as the runner-up to Stu Ungar at the 1997 World Series of Poker Main Event. As the final hand was unfolding, tournament commentator Gabe Kaplan had dubbed him the "Treasure of the Sierra Madre". Strzemp began the final hand with the best hand, A8 to Ungar's A4.  He led until a deuce on the river made a wheel for Ungar, giving Stu the victory and his third world championship.  Strzemp won $583,000 for his second-place finish.  In addition to Ungar, this final table also featured WSOP bracelet winners Ron Stanley and Mel Judah.

Strzemp has continued to play in tournaments, and has a total of ten cashes in the World Series of Poker.  He cashed in the 2007 WSOP Main Event, finishing 379th (out of over 6,000 players), winning $34,644.  His most recent WSOP cash was in 2009 in the $5,000 No Limit Hold'em event.  He has also cashed two times in the World Poker Tour, first in 2004 in the Party Poker Million Cruise event, and in 2008 in the $25,000 WPT Championship event.  As of 2009, Strzemp's tournament winnings exceed $900,000.

His son, John Strzemp, III, is also a poker player and made his first cash in the 2008 WSOP, finishing in 3rd place in the $1,500 No Limit Hold'em Shootout event.

References

1952 births
Living people
Businesspeople from Las Vegas
American poker players
American casino industry businesspeople